The Maltese Women's Knock-Out is the annual cup competition for women's football teams in Malta. Established in 1995–96, the competition is organised by the Malta Football Association.

List of finals

Results by team

See also 
 Maltese FA Trophy, the men's cup

References

External links
Cup at maltafootball.com

mal
Women's football competitions in Malta
Recurring sporting events established in 1996
Women